The 2014–15 UEFA Women's Champions League knockout phase began on 8 October 2014 and concluded on 14 May 2015 with the final at Friedrich-Ludwig-Jahn-Sportpark in Berlin, Germany to decide the champions of the 2014–15 UEFA Women's Champions League. A total of 32 teams competed in the knockout phase.

Times from 26 October 2014 up to 28 March 2015 (round of 16, quarter-finals first legs and first day of second legs) are CET (UTC+1), all other times are CEST (UTC+2).

Round and draw dates
UEFA has scheduled the competition as follows. In contrast to previous seasons, quarter-finals and semi-finals are now played on weekends.

Format
The knockout phase involves 32 teams: 22 teams which qualified directly, and 10 teams which qualified from the qualifying round (eight group winners and two best runners-up).

Each tie in the knockout phase, apart from the final, was played over two legs, with each team playing one leg at home. The team that scored more goals on aggregate over the two legs advanced to the next round. If the aggregate score was level, the away goals rule was applied, i.e. the team that scored more goals away from home over the two legs advanced. If away goals were also equal, then 30 minutes of extra time was played. The away goals rule was again applied after extra time, i.e. if there were goals scored during extra time and the aggregate score was still level, the visiting team advanced by virtue of more away goals scored. If no goals were scored during extra time, the tie was decided by penalty shoot-out. In the final, which was played as a single match, if scores were level at the end of normal time, extra time was played, followed by penalty shoot-out if scores remained tied.

The mechanism of the draws for each round was as follows:
In the draw for the round of 32, 16 teams were seeded and 16 teams were unseeded, based on their UEFA club coefficients at the beginning of the season. The seeded teams were drawn against the unseeded teams, with the seeded teams hosting the second leg. Teams from the same group or the same association could not be drawn against each other.
In the draws for the round of 16 onwards, there were no seedings, and teams from the same group or the same association could be drawn against each other.

Qualified teams
Below were the 32 teams which qualified for the knockout phase (with their 2014 UEFA club coefficients).

Notes

Bracket

Round of 32
The draw was held on 22 August 2014. The first legs were played on 8 and 9 October, and the second legs were played on 15 and 16 October 2014.

|}

First leg

Second leg

Fortuna Hjørring won 9–0 on aggregate.

2–2 on aggregate. Gintra Universitetas won 5–4 on penalties. 

Barcelona won 4–0 on aggregate.

Rosengård won 5–1 on aggregate.

Lyon won 14–0 on aggregate.

Neulengbach won 4–3 on aggregate.

Zürich won 7–2 on aggregate.

Glasgow City won 3–2 on aggregate.

Torres won 7–3 on aggregate.

Paris Saint-Germain won 3–1 on aggregate.

Zvezda Perm won 8–3 on aggregate.

Frankfurt won 6–2 on aggregate.

Wolfsburg won 3–1 on aggregate.

Brøndby won 3–2 on aggregate.

Linköping won 4–2 on aggregate.

Bristol Academy won 6–1 on aggregate.

Round of 16
The draw was held on 22 August 2014. The first legs were played on 8 and 9 November, and the second legs were played on 12 and 13 November 2014.

|}

Notes

First leg

Second leg

Frankfurt won 9–0 on aggregate.

Brøndby won 5–2 on aggregate.

Wolfsburg won 11–0 on aggregate.

Paris Saint-Germain won 2–1 on aggregate.

Glasgow City won 5–4 on aggregate.

Linköping won 5–3 on aggregate.

Rosengård won 4–1 on aggregate.

Bristol Academy won 2–1 on aggregate.

Quarter-finals
The draw was held on 19 November 2014. The first legs were played on 21 and 22 March, and the second legs were played on 28 and 29 March 2015.

|}

Notes

First leg

Second leg

Brøndby won 2–1 on aggregate.

4–4 on aggregate. Wolfsburg won on away goals.

Paris Saint-Germain won 7–0 on aggregate.

Frankfurt won 12–0 on aggregate.

Semi-finals
The draw was held on 19 November 2014. The first legs were played on 18 and 19 April and the second legs on 25 and 26 April 2015.

|}

First leg

Second leg

Frankfurt won 13–0 on aggregate.

Paris Saint-Germain won 3–2 on aggregate.

Final

The final was played on 14 May 2015 at Friedrich-Ludwig-Jahn-Sportpark in Berlin, Germany. The "home" team (for administrative purposes) was determined by an additional draw held after the semi-final draw.

References

External links
2014–15 UEFA Women's Champions League

knock-out stage